George Osborne (born 1971) was Chancellor of the Exchequer under the Cameron governments.

George Osborne may also refer to:

Dukes
George Osborne, 6th Duke of Leeds (1775–1838), British Master of the Horse, Lord Lieutenant of the North Riding of Yorkshire
George Osborne, 8th Duke of Leeds (1802–1872), eldest son of the 1st Baron Godolphin, nephew of 6th Duke
George Osborne, 9th Duke of Leeds (1828–1895), British peer
George Osborne, 10th Duke of Leeds (1862–1927), his son, British MP for Brixton, Treasurer of the Household

Others
George Osborne, a fictional character in the novel Vanity Fair
George Osborne (cricketer), English cricketer for Derbyshire County Cricket Club
George Alexander Osborne (1806–1893), Irish composer
Sir George Francis Osborne, 16th Baronet (1894–1960), Anglo-Irish baronet and British Army officer

See also
George Osborn (disambiguation)